Pagaivan is a 1997 Indian Tamil-language action comedy film directed by Ramesh Balakrishnan, starring Ajith Kumar, Sathyaraj and Anjala Zaveri. The film revolves around a kidnapping undertaken by Ajith's character and the actions that the victim's father take to save his daughter. The film also featured Ranjitha, Nagesh, K. S. Ravikumar and Vivek who all appear in supporting roles. It was released in August 1997 to mixed reviews but critics praises the comedy and performance of Sathyaraj. The film was a commercial failure.

Plot 

Prabhu, despite having all the required qualifications for the job he applied for, fails after he was demanded to pay a considerable amount as a caution deposit. And every time, all his chances of getting the job were hanging on the payment of this caution.

Determined to get the job at all costs, Prabhu is ready to do anything to obtain this amount as quickly as possible. So Prabhu decides to kidnap someone so as to demand a ransom from the family of this person. The fate leads him to abduct Uma, who happens to be the one and only daughter of Minister Durai Raj.

Uma falls in love with Prabhu and, before long, Prabhu begins to love Uma too. Meanwhile, Uma’s parents hire Vasu, a rowdy who’s ready to do anything for the sake of money, to find their daughter. The rest of the film revolves around if the pair will be found.

Cast 

Ajith Kumar as Prabhu
Sathyaraj as Vasu
Ranjitha as Esther
Anjala Zaveri as Uma Durairaj
Nagesh as Church father
K. S. Ravikumar as Minister Durairaj
Mansoor Ali Khan as Dharman
Babu Antony as Dharman's brother
Sumithra as Uma's mother
Delhi Ganesh as Prabhu's father
Vivek as Prabhu's friend
G. Venkateswaran as Padmanaban, Medicine company owner
Manobala as Govindhan
Bayilvan Ranganathan as Durairaj's assistant
Sempuli Jagan as Singam
Ajay Rathnam as the Police inspector
Balu Anand as a Security guard
Soundar as Barman
Mahanadi Shankar as Fighter
Naga Kannan as Welding Kannan
Vikram Singh as Singh
Dhamu as Prabhu's friend
Madhan Bob as Judge
Ravi Raj as Lawyer
Vellai Subbaiah as Kaliaperumal
S. Lalitha as Prabhu's mother
Priyanka as an Office clerk

Production 
During the making of the film, the producers fell out with actress Anjala Zaveri, causing the film to be briefly delayed.

Soundtrack 
The soundtrack was composed by Deva, with lyrics written by Vairamuthu.

Reception 
Ji of Kalki praised the acting of Sathyaraj and K. S.Ravikumar, he praised Deva's background score but panned his songs while also praising film's fast pace, fight choreography and camera angles.

References

External links 
 

1990s Tamil-language films
1997 action comedy films
1997 films
Films directed by Ramesh Balakrishnan
Films scored by Deva (composer)
Films set in Chennai
Indian action comedy films